Kunika Sadanand Lal is an Indian TV actor, advocate, producer and social activist. She is known for her various characters in many Indian films as a villain and in comic roles.

Also a singer, she has released three pop albums titled Lakhon Mein Ek released in 1996, and Kunika which was released in 2002. She released her third album named Joombish (A Mystical Journey) on 2 May 2006.

Personal life

She, along with her business partner, created restaurants called "White - the Italian café", "Zingcafe", "Majestica – The royal banquet hall" and a spa called "Exhale", in Goregaon in suburban Mumbai. The partnership however ended in 2007.

Kunika has conducted, organized and participated in over 100 stage shows in India and around the world. She is also running an event company called Karma Events and Entertainment.

Kunickaa Sadanand Lal has been actively involved in social activities like AIDS awareness campaigns for last 20 years.

She launched Tara Charitable Trust on 15 August 2005. This trust aims at rebuilding lives of destitute people, helping the underprivileged and providing medical, educational and emotional succor to the needy. She is a trustee to the NGO CHIP (Children In Progress), Mumbai, which is actively working for child health and education.

TV and film career
Since her teenage years, Kunika was keen to join the Indian TV industry as an actress. After doing a few TV serials in Delhi, she went to Mumbai to act in films. Manju Asrani, wife of well known comic actor Asrani gave Kunika a first break as an actress in a TV serial. Her second break was a role in the TV serial Adalat, directed by Dheeraj Kumar. Kunika began her film career at the age of 28 in a 1988 horror Hindi movie named Kabrastan. She was mainly involved in negative roles and bold scenes in the bulk of her movies. Kunika has done 110 films in 25 years.

Swabhimaan a TV serial, where she played an 18-year-old mother was a breakthrough role that won her many plaudits. Then, negative roles in films like Beta, Gumraah and Khiladi followed.

She acted in a TV serial called Kana Phoosi on Doordarshan and in Pyaar Ka Dard Hai Meetha Meetha Pyaara Pyaara on Star Plus. She was also seen in the reality TV show Box Cricket League on Sony Entertainment as a fielder from the team Pune Anmol Ratn, while most recently she played the character of Rani Durgavati in the TV serial Akbar Birbal on Big Magic. She is currently seen in &TV show Dilli Wali Thakur Gurls as a loud goan Christian Juliet Bai.

Filmography and television

Films

Television shows

Web series

References

External links
 Official Website
 

Living people
Actresses from Mumbai
Singers from Mumbai
Indian women pop singers
Actresses in Hindi cinema
Indian television actresses
Actresses in Hindi television
20th-century Indian actresses
21st-century Indian actresses
20th-century Indian women singers
21st-century Indian women singers
20th-century Indian singers
21st-century Indian singers
Women musicians from Maharashtra
Year of birth missing (living people)